Durval Guimarães (born 14 July 1935) is a Brazilian former sport shooter who competed in the 1968 Summer Olympics, the 1972 Summer Olympics, the 1976 Summer Olympics, the 1980 Summer Olympics and the 1984 Summer Olympics.

See also
 List of athletes with the most appearances at Olympic Games

References

1935 births
Living people
Brazilian male sport shooters
ISSF pistol shooters
ISSF rifle shooters
Olympic shooters of Brazil
Shooters at the 1968 Summer Olympics
Shooters at the 1972 Summer Olympics
Shooters at the 1976 Summer Olympics
Shooters at the 1980 Summer Olympics
Shooters at the 1984 Summer Olympics
Pan American Games medalists in shooting
Pan American Games silver medalists for Brazil
Pan American Games bronze medalists for Brazil
Shooters at the 1963 Pan American Games
Sportspeople from Santos, São Paulo
20th-century Brazilian people
21st-century Brazilian people